Andrew Nahuel Rivero Coli (born 21 August 1998) is an Uruguayan footballer who plays as an attacking midfielder.

Career

Club career
Rivero is a product of Atenas. He got his official debut for Atenas in the Uruguayan Segunda División on 6 March 2016 against Rampla Juniors. Rivero was in the starting lineup, but was replaced at halftime. He made a total of eight appearances in that season. In the following two years, Rivero didn't play a single game for Atenas' first team, but was instead used on the reserve team.

He made his comeback in the Uruguayan Segunda División for Atenas in 2019, where he played three times. In February 2020, he was loaned out to fellow league club Rocha F.C. for the rest of 2020.

References

External links
 

Living people
1998 births
Association football midfielders
Uruguayan footballers
Uruguayan Segunda División players
Atenas de San Carlos players
Rocha F.C. players
People from Maldonado, Uruguay